A peace committee is an association of persons who support peace in a situation of conflict.  Many such groups have existed.  Some are associations of concerned persons; some are propaganda fronts for national, sectional, or sectarian interests; others are devoted to disputes within organizations.  This is a very incomplete list:

International committees
 World Peace Congress, a "non-governmental organization dedicated to constructing an institutional basis for world peace", 2007–present
 World Peace Council, an organization that advocates "universal disarmament, sovereignty and independence and peaceful co-existence", 1950–present
 Soviet Peace Committee or Soviet Committee for the Defense of Peace, a committee of the U.S.S.R., 1949–1991
 Peace Council (http://www.peacecouncil.org), a group of spiritual leaders who "work for the common cause of humanity", 1995–present
 Women's International League for Peace and Freedom, founded in 1915 during World War I, advocates "world disarmament, full rights for women, racial and economic justice, an end to all forms of violence".

National and local committees
 East Pakistan Central Peace Committee, a group opposed to the rebellion that resulted in the independence war of East Pakistan (now Bangladesh) in 1971
 Australian Peace Committee, "aimed at promoting disarmament, human rights, justice, development and peace"
 Committee for a Just Peace in Israel and Palestine, advancing "the cause of peace and justice for both Palestinians and Israelis"
 , an interreligious group founded in Chile in 1973 to oppose the Pinochet regime's human rights abuses; gave way to the Vicariate of Solidarity in 1976

Intra-organizational committees
 Southern Baptist Convention Peace Committee (http://www.baptist2baptist.net/b2barticle.asp?id=65), a committee to resolve conflicts within the Southern Baptist Convention, 1987

References

External links
 Mohamud Adan and Ruto Pkalya, "The Concept Peace Committee" (http://practicalaction.org/concept-peace-committee), including a description of peace committees

Peace organizations
Committees